Greenbank is part of the city of Plymouth in the county of Devon, England.

Greenbank lies to the west of Freedom Fields, a park preserving the approximate site of a battle during the English Civil War. It is a Victorian and Edwardian residential area with many small public houses and shops, and is now favoured by students. It is home to a principal fire-station and formerly of Plymouth's two main hospitals, both recently demolished. It is a short walking distance from the city centre and sea front area as well as the university and Beaumont Park to the south.

Suburbs of Plymouth, Devon